Geritola albomaculata, the white-spotted epitola, is a butterfly in the family Lycaenidae. It is found in Sierra Leone, Ivory Coast and Cameroon.

References

Butterflies described in 1903
Poritiinae
Butterflies of Africa
Taxa named by George Thomas Bethune-Baker